The Mess is a river flowing through Luxembourg, joining the Alzette at Lameschmillen, near Bergem.  It flows through the towns of Reckange-sur-Mess and Pontpierre.

Rivers of Luxembourg